Mauny may refer to:

People
 Constance Mauny (born 1998), French handball player
 Erik de Mauny (1920–1997), English journalist and author
 Marc de Mauny (born 1971), French theatre manager and opera producer
 Walter Mauny, also known as Walter Manny, 1st Baron Manny

Places
 Mauny, Seine-Maritime, Normandy, France